This is a list of programs that have been or are being broadcast by TV3 (Viasat) on its Norwegian channel.

0-9

A

B

C

D

E

F

G

H

I

J

K

L

M

N

O

P

Q

R

S

T

U

V

W

X

Y

Ø

References

External links
 TV3 - Programmer

TV3